Fighting Mad is a 1976 American action film directed by Jonathan Demme, about an Arkansas farmer played by Peter Fonda who uses Guerrilla tactics against corrupt land developers attempting to evict his family and his neighbors in order to stripmine their land.

Plot
An evil corporation tries to pressure a bunch of Arkansas farmers and ranchers to sell their land so they can strip-mine it for coal. The fiercely proud and stubborn Hunter family refuse to give in. This leads to a bitter conflict that results in several casualties. Eventually the take-charge no-nonsense Tom Hunter exacts a harsh revenge on the villains with the help of his bow and arrow.

Cast
Peter Fonda as Tom Hunter 
Lynn Lowry as Lorene Maddox
John Doucette as Jeff Hunter 
Philip Carey as Pierce Crabtree 
Harry Northup as Sheriff Len Skerritt 
Noble Willingham as Senator Hingle 
Kathleen Miller as Carolee Hunter
Scott Glenn as Charlie Hunter
Ted Markland as Hal Fraser

Production
In making the film, producer Roger Corman analysed three other recent low-budget rural action thrillers that had been big hits: Billy Jack (1971), Walking Tall (1973) and Dirty Mary, Crazy Larry (1974). He deduced they had three things in common: a hero with an off-beat sidekick, an unusual mode of transport and an interesting weapon. This is why the Peter Fonda character travels on an old motorcycle with his toddler son and uses a compound bow.

References

External links
 
 

1976 films
Films directed by Jonathan Demme
Films set in Arkansas
1976 action films
20th Century Fox films
Films produced by Roger Corman
Films scored by Bruce Langhorne
1970s English-language films
American action films
1970s American films